Rita Sakellariou (born 22 November  1934, Sitia, Crete, Greece – died 6 August 1999, Athens, Greece) was a Greek singer.

Biography
Her mother originated in Kalymnos and her father in Izmir. As a child, her father, a Partisan was killed in the 1946-49 civil war, from a stray bullet on Crete where she had been born and bred. Her mother moved with her three children to the port of Piraeus to try to make ends meet.

At 12, she left school to help earn a living for her family selling bread and lemons in a cart she pushed around Piraeus's desolate streets. Later, in the poverty-stricken 50s, she worked in factories; and when the going got really tough - after her first marriage foundered - she gathered garbage at the slums' rubbish dump. In the meantime, Rita had already made her second marriage to wrestler Stefanos Sidiropoulos, known in the fight with the nickname "White Angel", whom she met in Thessaloniki in 1969 and married him after a year. At 22, he was younger than Rita by 13 years.

Throughout these years, she continued to sing in the Queen Ann, a nightclub her husband had established on the National Road out of Athens. The 70s saw a series of hits, including Kathe Iliovasilema (Every Sunset) and Oi Andres kai oi Handres (Men and Beads). She remained popular, although her efforts to follow music trends through the 1980s and 1990s failed to match her earlier successes.

She had numerous hits, including "Istoria Mou, Amartia Mou", "An Kano Atakti Zoi", "Aftos O Anthropos", "Paranomi Mou Agapi" and "Ena Tragoudi". On 14 March 2010, Alpha TV ranked Sakellariou the 17th top-certified female artist in the nation's phonographic era (since 1960).

During her last years she lived in Nea Smyrni neighbourhood of Athens.

Death

In August 28, 1998, she and her friend Lakis Korres took a short vacation to Epidaurus. There she felt bad, crouching in bathroom from a terrible pain. At Hygeia Hospital, medical checks confirmed she was suffering from lung cancer which metastasized to her bones.

The doctors had given her one-year to live. She immediately received chemotherapy. Around January, she began to take courage and feel better. So was then offered a proposal to do concerts in Australia. According to Korres, although the situation was aggravated, she felt good. Wearing a wig, they made a stop in Singapore for not getting tired, then continued journey. She appeared in 5 of the 10 concerts. They returned to Greece and medical checks showed the cancer had spread to vocal cords.

She went on to sing in Crete and Hamezi. She even went to Sitia, where she sang in the local celebrations unflatteringly. Shortly before she died, as if she had been told of her death, she had asked her son, Takis, to go to Hamezi while her dream was to buy the house where she was born, a wish that was never fulfilled.

Before she died she called her first husband, who also suffered from cancer, telling him "you'll take me with you, or I'll take you with me", something that turned out to be prophetic as she died 18 days before him 

Sakellariou died on 6 August 1999, aged 64, after spending 40 days at Hygeia Hospital in Athens after returning from treatment at Memorial Sloan–Kettering Cancer Center in New York City. According to Korres, her last words were, "Oh Lakis, and I had so much yet to do!"

She was survived by four sons and a daughter, two children from her first marriage, and three children from the second. She was buried on 9 August in the First Cemetery of Athens.

The ex-wife of Rita Sakellariou's son, Katerina Stanisi, said in an interview in 2017 that she was the last person to visit Rita Sakellariou in the hospital a few minutes before she died.

Popular culture
In the 1973 blockbuster The Exorcist, Jason Miller starred as Greek American Father Damien Karras, one of the priests who exorcised young Regan. In one scene, Karras’ mother, played by Greek actress Vasiliki Maliaros, is listening to a Greek radio station broadcasting the song Istoria mou, amartia mou.

References

External links
Rita Sakellariou biography, sansimera.com
Sakellariou profile, musicpedia.gr

1934 births
1999 deaths
Deaths from lung cancer in Greece
20th-century Greek women singers
Greek laïko singers
People from Sitia
Burials at the First Cemetery of Athens